Dichelobius etnaensis is a species of centipede in the Henicopidae family. It is endemic to Australia. It was first described in 2004.

Distribution
The species occurs in eastern Central Queensland. The type locality is the Cammoo Caves in the Mount Etna Caves National Park, near Rockhampton.

References

 

 
etnaensis
Centipedes of Australia
Endemic fauna of Australia
Fauna of Queensland
Animals described in 2004